Vaughan King (born 5 October 1982) is an English singer-songwriter for punk/blues bands NED and Dirt Diggers. He is currently living in Camden, London.

In late 2007, he formed Vaughan King and his Riff Raff. The band originally consisted of two cellists, a double bass player and the customary instrumentation of drums and guitars.  However, after turning to a more blues inspired set the band separated. His style was described as "thought-provoking" and "having an interesting and clever array of instruments." In a 2009 blog, Vaughan announced that plans are well under way for the follow-up to The Triumphant and hopes to release new material by the end of the year. In 2010 he released an EP entitled 'Ballad Of A Poor Man' which was released with an animated video.  In early 2011 it was announced that the band would be known as 'Dirt Diggers' and they would be releasing downloads and demos throughout the year.

The Triumphant
Vaughan's debut album The Triumphant has been released to critical acclaim with Kerrang! magazine awarding it 4 out of 5 and drawing comparisons with Jeff Buckley. The Triumphant was also described as "being one of this years best kept secrets"
whilst Rock Sound magazine depict him "as beautiful, deep and dangerous as a frosty river on a moonlit winter's night." R2 (Rock'n'Reel) also awarded him 4 out of 5, describing The Triumphant as "Perfect and Beautiful....a decadent piece of work."

The first single taken from the album was "The Forgiven And The Forgotten", accompanied by a remix of the song by Bigo & Twigetti and a live video which was shot at the Camden's Barfly club.

The second single, "This Empty Landfill", has cover artwork depicting Vaughan King as the Russian monk, Grigori Yefimovich Rasputin. The B-side was a remix of the album track "Two Souls", remixed by the artist HWH. The single received glowing praise, with Subba Cultcha describing it as a "stirring, soulfully constructed mix of Nick Drake 's despair and Damien Rice'''s melodic bite."

The final release from The Triumphant was a double A-side featuring "Two Souls" and the bonus track "End to End" on 22 June 2009, it coincided with the deluxe release of the album on 6 July 2009.

Vaughan also featured and was interviewed on BBC Radio, on The Steve Scruton Show, which is presented by Steve Scruton, on 13 August 2008.

Discography

 Albums 
 The Triumphant (2008)
 The Triumphant (Deluxe Edition) (2009)

 EP 
 Ballad Of A Poor Man (2010)

Singles
 "The Forgiven and the Forgotten
 B-Side : "The Forgiven and the Forgotten" (Bigo and Twigetti Remix)
 "This Empty Landfill"
 B-Side : "Two Souls" (HWH Remix).
 "Two Souls" / "End to End" (Double A-Side)

Influences
Tom Waits
Screamin' Jay Hawkins
Nick Cave
David Lynch
Lead Belly

References

External links
Official Vaughan King website
Official Vaughan King Myspace
Vaughan King on YouTube

1982 births
Living people
English male singer-songwriters
Punk blues musicians
21st-century English singers
21st-century British male singers